YI Technology, also known as Xiaoyi in Mainland China markets, is a company that manufactures cameras and computer vision technologies. Some of the company's popular camera models include the YI 1080p Home Camera, and the YI Outdoor Security Camera. YI Technology was originally backed and branded by Xiaomi, but in October 2016, YI split off from Xiaomi, dropping the "Xiaomi Yi" branding.

Since its founding YI Technology has gone on to produce a wide range of indoor and outdoor security cameras and has shipped products to over 186 countries and created the sub-brand "Kami" in late 2018.

History

YI Technology was founded in 2014 and is headquartered in Shanghai, China.

In 2018, YI Technology partnered with Google to produce the YI Horizon VR180, Google's first VR180 marketplace camera.

On Nov 7, 2018, YI Technology launched the sub-brand "Kami" and released the Kami Indoor Camera.

Products

Notable products include:

 YI Halo Camera (discontinued)
 YI 360 VR Camera (discontinued)
 YI 1080p Home Camera
 YI Dome X Camera
 YI Outdoor Security camera
 YI Lite Action Camera
 YI 4K Action Camera
 YI M1 Mirrorless Camera (discontinued)
 YI Nightscape Dash Camera
 YI Smart Dash Camera
YI PTZ 1080p Outdoor camera 
Kami Indoor Camera
Kami Outdoor Camera

Recognition

YI Technology has received a number of awards in mainland China and abroad. Some awards include the 2017 Red Dot Award for Product design, and the 2018 DISTREE EMEA Smart Tech Diamond Award.

See also

 Home Security
 Edge Computing
 Security Cameras
 Google Nest
 Ring

References

External links 

 

Chinese brands
Consumer electronics brands
Technology companies established in 2014
Chinese companies established in 2014
Technology companies of China
Security companies